Virginia's 22nd House of Delegates district elects one of 100 seats in the Virginia House of Delegates, the lower house of the state's bicameral legislature. District 22, consisting of Bedford County, Lynchburg, Campbell County, and Franklin County, has been represented by Republican Kathy Byron since 1998.

District officeholders

Electoral history

References

External links
 

Virginia House of Delegates districts
Bedford County, Virginia
Campbell County, Virginia
Franklin County, Virginia